Lee Gold is a member of California science fiction fandom and a writer and editor in the role-playing game and filk music communities.

Gaming 
Gold became prominent after 1975 as the editor of Alarums and Excursions, a monthly amateur press association to which RPG writers have contributed over the years. It won the Charles S. Roberts Award for Best Amateur Wargame Magazine in 1984, and the Origins Award for Best Amateur Game Periodical in 2000, 2001, and 2002. Gold began the publication at the request of Bruce Pelz, who felt that discussion of Dungeons & Dragons was taking up too much space in APA-L, an amateur press association loosely associated with the Los Angeles Science Fantasy Society.

Gold was listed in the 'Top 50 Most Influential People in the Adventure Game Market for Y2000'

Professional Works 
Her professional credits in the RPG field include Land of the Rising Sun and Lands of Adventure, published by Fantasy Games Unlimited; GURPS Japan, published by Steve Jackson Games; and Vikings, published by Iron Crown Enterprises. Land of the Rising Sun (1980) was a Japanese-themed role-playing game using the Chivalry & Sorcery game system, and Lands of Adventure (1983) used a game system meant for historical fantasy role-playing games.

Gold's novel Valhalla: Absent Without Leave was published March 30, 2021 by Penmore Press. Gold wrote, "But the book isn't about the ancient Norse or the Vikings.  It's about a modern hero who arrived at Valhalla with her D&D magic sword,  Frostbite.  Robin Grima isn't content to train in Valhalla to fight and die in Ragnarok.  She wants to stop Ragnarok from happening!  She doesn't care about the prophecies.  She wants to win!". Valhalla: Into The Darkness, the second novel in her trilogy, was published in early 2022.

Land of the Rising Sun #2 was named Best Roleplaying Expansion (People's Choice) by UK Games Expo 2021.

Filk 
In 1988, Gold (who had been filking since 1967) also began publishing Xenofilkia, a bimonthly collection of filk lyrics (and some sheet music). Over 400 songwriters have contributed, including Leslie Fish, Tom Smith and Bob Kanefsky. Although Gold has published filk lyrics, she has never recorded for public distribution.

Lee and Barry Gold were jointly inducted into the Filk Hall of Fame in 1997 and were Interfilk guests at Ohio Valley Filk Fest in 2000.

Lee and Barry Gold were Featured Filkers at Boskone 44 in 2007.

In 2012, Gold published Dr. Jane's Songs, a compilation of all of Dr. Jane's songs that Jim Robinson could find in his archives, plus a few that Lee Gold found from other sources, with illustrations. In 2014, she published a compilation of all the songs by Cynthia McQuillin that Gold, Robinson, McQuillin's literary executors and several other people could track down, over 450 pages of songs.

Publishing history 
Lee Gold published the fan fiction fanzine "The Third Foundation" from 1967 until at least 1969.

As of September 2022, she had published 563 issues of Alarums and Excursions and 205 issues of Xenofilkia, as well as six volumes of Filker Up!, a filk-song anthology.

She published Tom Digby: Along Fantasy Way, a collection of writings by Tom Digby, for ConFrancisco, the 1993 Worldcon where Digby was an Honored Guest, and has published writings by other prominent fan writers in the Los Angeles area.

She has also published a collection of songs by Dr. Jane Robinson (2012-9-10), and another of songs by Cynthia McQuillin (2014-3-8).  In both cases, James Robinson sent copies of all the songs in his possession to Gold. Kristoph Klover and Margaret Davis (McQuillin's literary executors) lent McQuillin's handwritten songs to Robinson, who copied them and sent them to Gold for inclusion. Many other people helped make the McQuillin songbook as complete as possible: the subhead for the songbook reads "all the songs written by Cynthia McQuillin that Dr. James Robinson and Lee Gold and Mary Creasey and Harold Stein and Bob Kanefsky and Alan Thiesen and Margaret Davis and Kristoph Klover could find in 2013."

References

American science fiction writers
Filkers
Living people
Role-playing game designers
Women science fiction and fantasy writers
GURPS writers
Year of birth missing (living people)